Several vessels have been named Windsor Castle for Windsor Castle:

 was launched at Whitby. From 1797 she made five voyages as a slave ship and foundered off Bermuda in 1803 after having disembarked her slaves.
, a packet boat that on 1 October 1807, captured a French privateer after a sanguinary engagement. An American privateer captured Windsor Castle on 15 March 1815.
Windsor Castle was the ship , launched in 1807, that the Royal Navy sold in 1816. She became the mercantile Windsor Castle and was condemned at Mauritius in June 1826.
 was built by James Edwards at South Shields. 
 was a passenger/cargo ship built by William Pile in Sunderland, that was wrecked in 1884.
 SS Windsor Castle (1922), a Union-Castle passenger ship launched in 1922
 , a Union-Castle passenger ship launched in 1959.

See also
 – one of six vessels of the Royal Navy by that name

Citations

Ship names